Reutibach is a river of Baden-Württemberg, Germany. It flows into the Stehenbach in Unterstadion. Reutibach has an elevation of 506 metres. Reutibach is situated nearby to Unterstadion, close to Weiherbach.

See also
List of rivers of Baden-Württemberg
List of rivers in Germany

References
Rivers of Baden-Württemberg
Rivers of Germany

 https://mapcarta.com/18041168